Keith "Buzzer" Gordon Mackay (born 8 December 1956 in Wellington, New Zealand) was a football (soccer) player who represented New Zealand  internationally, appearing in all 3 matches of New Zealand's first FIFA World Cup finals appearance. 

Mackay made his full All Whites debut in a 4–0 win over Mexico on 20 August 1980. He represented the All Whites for all three matches at the 1982 FIFA World Cup in Spain, where they lost to Scotland, USSR and Brazil. Mackay ended his international playing career having played 48 times for New Zealand. 36 of these appearances were A-international caps. He scored a solitary goal in A-internationals against Fiji during the 'Road to Spain' 1982 World Cup qualifying campaign. His final full New Zealand cap was as a substitute in a 1–1 draw with Fiji on 18 October 1984. Keith ended his All White career later that year against England B in Nottingham.  He is currently the Coach of the Junior Boys' team at Alfriston College in Manurewa, South Auckland.

References

External links
 (note: Incorrectly named at FIFA site as "Keith McKay")

1956 births
Living people
1982 FIFA World Cup players
New Zealand association footballers
New Zealand international footballers
Gisborne City AFC players
Manurewa AFC players
Association football midfielders